Montserrado-1 is an electoral district for the elections to the House of Representatives of Liberia. The district covers Todee District and Careysburg District.

Elected representatives

References

Electoral districts in Liberia